Marcello Possenti (born 6 July 1992) is an Italian footballer who plays as a left defender for  club Renate.

Club career
Possenti made his debut for Nerazzurri on 27 October 2010, on Coppa Italia, against Livorno, and he played the whole match.

In July 2011, he was loaned to S.S. Tritium 1908, alongside Emanuele Suagher, Jurgen Pandiani and Christian Monacizzo.

He made his debut for Tritium on 7 August 2011, against Benevento.

On 5 July 2019, he signed with Renate.

International
He represented Italy at the under-19 level, in a friendly against Romania.

References

External links
 

1992 births
Living people
Footballers from Bergamo
Italian footballers
Association football defenders
Serie C players
Serie D players
Atalanta B.C. players
Tritium Calcio 1908 players
F.C. Lumezzane V.G.Z. A.S.D. players
A.C. Reggiana 1919 players
Pordenone Calcio players
Santarcangelo Calcio players
Aurora Pro Patria 1919 players
Reggina 1914 players
Carrarese Calcio players
Forlì F.C. players
A.C. Renate players
Italy youth international footballers